Algernon James Bullock Marsham (14 August 1919 – 11 February 2004) was an English cricketer.

Marsham played in 17 first-class cricket matches between 1939 and 1947 as a left-handed batsman and a right arm leg break bowler. He was the last member of the famous Marsham family, which included his father C. H. B. Marsham and grandfather C. D. B. Marsham, to play cricket for Kent.

Marsham was educated at Eton and Christ Church, Oxford. During World War II he was commissioned in the King's Royal Rifle Corps and was for some time a prisoner of war in Germany.

References

External links

1919 births
2004 deaths
Kent cricketers
Oxford University cricketers
Combined Services cricketers
English cricketers
Marylebone Cricket Club cricketers
People educated at Eton College
Alumni of Christ Church, Oxford
King's Royal Rifle Corps officers
British Army personnel of World War II